WMYK (98.5 FM "Rock 98.5") is a mainstream rock radio station owned by Hoosier AM/FM LLC in Kokomo, Indiana.  The station is located at the "Radio Ranch" on State Road 26 in Kokomo.

Weekday line-up includes:

1a-5a Non-Stop Rock Blocks

5a-10a The Free Beer and Hot Wings Show

10a-2p Erika Bowman

2p-8p Stevie Riggs

8p-1a Sammy After Dark

A Block Party Weekend starts every Friday night at 6p and goes until Sunday night at 7p. This consists of multiple-song sets by some of the station's core artists.

Sister stations
WIOU
WZWZ

External links

MYK
Mainstream rock radio stations in the United States